Chitinivibrio is an extremely haloalkaliphilic genus of bacteria from the family of Chitinivibrionaceae with one known species (Chitinivibrio alkaliphilus). Chitinivibrio alkaliphilus has been isolated from hypersaline lake sediments from Wadi al Natrun in Egypt.

References

Bacteria genera
Monotypic bacteria genera